The 1961–62 Montenegrin Republic League was 17th season of Montenegrin Republic League. For the first time after the season 1954–55 competition was unified, without final tournaments and zones as qualifying phase. Season started in August 1961 and finished in May 1962.

Season 

Before the start of season, Football Association of Montenegro make the decision to create an unified competition with nine teams – three representatives of central Montenegro (OFK Titograd, Čelik and Gorštak), three from northern Montenegro (Rudar, Jedinstvo and Brskovo) and three from southern Montenegro (Lovćen, Bokelj and Arsenal).
During the sixteen weeks long season, five teams battled for first place. At the end, OFK Titograd won the title and participated in the qualifiers for Yugoslav Second League.

Table

Qualifiers for Yugoslav Second League 
OFK Titograd played in the qualifiers for 1962–63 Second League – East. As a last-placed team in the group, they didn't succeed to gain a new promotion to second-tier.

Higher leagues 
On season 1961–62, two Montenegrin teams played in higher leagues of SFR Yugoslavia. Both of them (Budućnost and Sutjeska) participated in 1961–62 Yugoslav Second League.

See also 
 Montenegrin Republic League
 Montenegrin Republic Cup (1947–2006)
 Montenegrin clubs in Yugoslav football competitions (1946–2006)
 Montenegrin Football Championship (1922–1940)

References 

Montenegrin Republic League